William Glen (1783–1826), Scottish poet, born in Glasgow, was for some years in the West Indies. He died in poverty. He wrote several poems, but the only one which has survived is his Jacobite ballad, Wae's me for Prince Charlie.

1789 births
1826 deaths
Writers from Glasgow
Scottish poets